An election to Essex County Council took place on 4 May 1989 as part of the 1989 United Kingdom local elections. 98 councillors were elected from various electoral divisions, which returned either one or two county councillors each by first-past-the-post voting for a four-year term of office.

Summary

Results

|-bgcolor=#F6F6F6
| colspan=2 style="text-align: right; margin-right: 1em" | Total
| style="text-align: right;" | 98
| colspan=5 |
| style="text-align: right;" | 436153
| style="text-align: right;" | 
|-
|}

Results by Electoral Divisions

Basildon

District Summary

Division Results

Braintree

District Summary

Division Results

Brentwood

District Summary

Division Results

Castle Point

Division Results

Chelmsford

Division Results

Colchester

Division Results

Epping Forest

Division Results

Harlow

Division Results

Maldon

Division Results

Rochford

Division Results

Southend

Division Results

Tendring

Division Results

Thurrock

Division Results

Uttlesford

Division Results

References

Essex County Council elections
1989 English local elections
1980s in Essex